The 2005 Nottingham Open, also known as The 10tele.com Open- Nottingham for sponsorship reasons, was the 2005 edition of the Nottingham Open men's tennis tournament and played on outdoor grass courts. The tournament was part of the International Series of the 2005 ATP Tour. It was the 16th edition of the tournament and was held from 13 June through 18 June 2005. Fourth-seeded Richard Gasquet won the singles title.

Finals

Singles

 Richard Gasquet defeated  Max Mirnyi 6–2, 6–3

Doubles

 Jonathan Erlich /  Andy Ram defeated  Simon Aspelin /  Todd Perry 4–6, 6–3, 7–5

References

External links
 ITF – tournament edition details

Nottingham
Nottingham Open
2005 Nottingham Open